BDR may refer to:

 BD-R or Blu-ray Disc recordable
 Backcountry Discovery Routes, US-base non-profit organization that creates off-highway routes for dual-sport and adventure motorcycle travel
 Backup Designated Router, the router interfaced used in the Open Shortest Path First protocol if the designated router fails
 Backup and Disaster Recovery appliance
 Bangladesh Rifles, now Border Guard Bangladesh
 Belajar dari Rumah, an Indonesian television block
 Big Dad Ritch, lead vocalist for American heavy metal band Texas Hippie Coalition
 Bilateral Digit Reduction, in fossil birds
 Bill Davis Racing, a NASCAR team
 German Cycling Federation (Bund Deutscher Radfahrer)
 PostgreSQL Bi Directional Replication
 Sikorsky Memorial Airport (FAA and IATA codes)